The 2014 Saginaw Sting season was the sixth season for the Continental Indoor Football League (CIFL) franchise.

In June 2013, the Sting agreed to terms with the CIFL to return for the 2014 season. The Sting won their first eighth game of the season to advance to 8-0, but during that game the Sting lost quarterback A. J. McKenna to injury. The following week the team lost 2013 league MVP, C. J. Tarver to the Winnipeg Blue Bombers of the Canadian Football League (CFL). The loss of those two key players became noticeable when the Sting lost their final regular season game to finish 9-1. Just one day before the Sting's first playoff game, head coach Fred Townsead announced his resignation. Line Coach James Perry II was named the teams interim head coach. The Sting were upset in the first round of the playoffs, 46-15, by the same team that had defeated them in the previous year's championship, the Erie Explosion.

Roster

Schedule

Regular season

Standings

Postseason

Coaching staff

References

2014 Continental Indoor Football League season
Saginaw Sting
Saginaw Sting